This is a list of 188 species in the genus Ectemnius.

Ectemnius species

References